Chinese nationalism is a form of nationalism in the People's Republic of China (Mainland China) and the Republic of China on Taiwan which asserts that the Chinese people are a nation and promotes the cultural and national unity of all Chinese people. It is often equated with Han nationalism, although these two concepts are different. According to Sun Yat-sen's philosophy in the Three Principles of the People, Chinese nationalism should be a form of civic nationalism constructed on top of a united value, however this has not been fully recognized or applied in practice by successors.

Modern Chinese nationalism emerged in the late Qing dynasty (1636–1912) in response to the humiliating defeat in the First Sino-Japanese War and the invasion and pillaging of Beijing by the Eight-Nation Alliance. In both cases, the aftermath forced China to pay financial reparations and grant special privileges to foreigners. The nationwide image of China as a superior Celestial Empire at the center of the universe was shattered, and last-minute efforts to modernize the old system were unsuccessful. These last-minute efforts were best exemplified by Liang Qichao, a late Qing reformer who failed to reform the Qing government in 1896 and was later expelled to Japan, where he began work on his ideas of Chinese nationalism.

The effects of World War I continually shaped Chinese nationalism. Despite joining the Allied Powers, China was again severely humiliated by the Versailles Treaty of 1919 which transferred the special privileges given to Germany to the Empire of Japan. This resulted in the May Fourth Movement of 1919, which developed into nationwide protests that saw a surge of Chinese nationalism. Large-scale military campaigns led by the Kuomintang during the Warlord Era that overpowered provincial warlords and sharply reduced special privileges for foreigners helped further strengthen and aggrandize a sense of Chinese national identity.

After the Empire of Japan was defeated by Allies in World War II, Chinese nationalism again gained traction as China recovered lost territories previously lost to Japan before the war, including Northeast area and the island of Taiwan. However, the Chinese Civil War, (which had paused in the face of Japanese invasion) had resumed, damaging the image of a unified Chinese identity. The Communists were victorious in 1949, as the Kuomintang retreated to Taiwan. Under Mao Zedong, the Chinese Communist Party (CCP) began to employ Chinese nationalism as a political tool. Using Chinese nationalism, the CCP began to suppress separatism and secessionist attitudes in Tibet, Inner Mongolia, and among the Uyghurs, a Turkic minority in the far-west province of Xinjiang, an issue that persists. In modern times, especially due to changing US-China relations, the Ministry of Foreign Affairs of the People's Republic of China often cite ideas of Chinese nationalism when responding to press questions on the topic.

Development of national consciousness

The first state of China was confirmed as the Shang dynasty (c. 1570 BC-c. 1045 BC). The Chinese concept of the world was largely a division between the civilized world and the barbarian world and there was little concept of the belief that Chinese interests were served by a powerful Chinese state. Commenter Lucian Pye has argued that the modern "nation state" is fundamentally different from a traditional empire, and argues that dynamics of the current People's Republic of China (PRC) – a concentration of power at a central point of authority – share an essential similarity with the Ming and Qing Empires.

Chinese nationalism as it emerged in the early 20th century was based on the experience of Japanese nationalism, especially as viewed and interpreted by Sun Yat-sen. Chinese nationalism was rooted in the long historic tradition of China as the center of the world, in which all other states were offshoots and owed some sort of deference. That sense of superiority underwent a series of terrible shocks in the 19th century, including large-scale internal revolts, and more grievously the systematic gaining and removal of special rights and privileges by foreign nations who proved their military superiority during the First and Second Opium Wars, based on modern technology that was lacking in China. It was a matter of humiliation one after another, the loss of faith in the Qing Dynasty. By the 1890s, disaffected Chinese intellectuals began to develop "a new nationalist commitment to China as a nation-state in a world dominated by predatory imperialist nation states." Overall, their concern was not in preserving a traditional Chinese order but instead the construction of a strong state and society that could stand in a hostile international arena. Unlike many nationalist projects in other countries, the trend among Chinese intellectuals was to regard tradition as unsuitable for China's survival and instead to view tradition as a source of China's problems.

China's defeat by Japan in the 1894-1895 First Sino-Japanese war was fundamental to the development of the first generation of Chinese nationalists. The most dramatic watershed came in 1900, in the wake of the invasion, capture, and pillaging of the national capital by an eight-nation coalition that punished China for the Boxer Rebellion. Ethnic nationalism was, in any case, unacceptable to the ruling Manchu elitethey were foreigners who conquered China and maintained their own language and traditions. Most citizens had multiple identities, of which the locality was more important than the nation as a whole. Anyone who wanted to rise in government non-military service had to be immersed in Confucian classics, and pass a very difficult test. If accepted, they would be rotated around the country, so the bureaucrats did not identify with the locality. The depth of two-way understanding and trust developed by European political leaders and their followers did not exist.

The Second Sino-Japanese war was one of the most important events in the modern construction of Chinese nationalism. The Chinese experience in the war helped create an ideology based on the concept of “the people” as a political body in its own right, “a modern nation as opposed to a feudal empire.”

Ideological sources

The discussion of modern Chinese nationalism has dominated many political and intellectual debates since the late nineteenth century. Political scientist Suisheng Zhao argues that nationalism in China is not monolithic but exists in various forms, including political, liberal, ethnical, and state nationalism. Over the first half of the twentieth century, Chinese nationalism has constituted a crucial part of many political ideologies, including the anti-Manchuism during the 1911 Revolution, the anti-imperialist sentiment of the May Fourth Movement in 1919, and the Maoist thoughts that guided the Communist Revolution in 1949. The origin of modern Chinese nationalism can be traced back to the intellectual debate on race and nation in late nineteenth century. Shaped by the global discourse of social Darwinism, reformers and intellectuals debated how to build a new Chinese national subject based on a proper racial order, particularly the Manchu-Han relations. After the collapse of the Qing regime and the founding of the Republic of China in 1911, concerns of both domestic and international threat made the role of racism decline, while anti-imperialism became the new dominant ideology of Chinese nationalism over the 1910s. While intellectuals and elites advocated their distinctive thoughts on Chinese nationalism, political scientist Chalmers Johnson has pointed out that most of these ideas had very little to do with China's majority population—the Chinese peasantry. He thus proposes to supplement the Chinese communist ideology in the discussion of Chinese nationalism, which he labels "peasant nationalism."

Chinese nationalism in the early twentieth century was primarily based on anti-Manchurism, an ideology that was prevalent among Chinese revolutionaries from late nineteenth century to the turn of the twentieth century. After Qing's defeat in the Sino-Japanese War of 1895, reformers and intellectuals debated how to strengthen the nation, the discussion of which centered on the issue of race. Liang Qichao, a late Qing reformist who participated in the Hundred Days' Reform of 1898, contended that the boundary between Han and Manchu must be erased (ping Man-Han zhi jie). Liang's thought was based on the idea of racial competition, a concept originating from social Darwinism that believed only superior races would survive whereas the inferior races were bound to extinct. Liang attributed the decline of China to the Qing dynasty ruled by the Manchus, who treated the Han as an "alien race" and imposed a racial hierarchy between the Han and the Manchus while ignoring the threat of imperial powers. However Liang's critique of the Qing court and the Manchu-Han relations laid the foundation for anti-Manchuism, an ideology that early Republican and nationalist revolutionaries advocated in their efforts to overthrow the Qing dynasty and found a new Republic in China. In his writing “Revolutionary Army,” Zou Rong, an active Chinese revolutionary at the turn of the twentieth century, demanded a revolution education for the Han people who were suffering from the oppression of the Manchu rule. He argued that China should be a nation of the orthodox Han Chinese and no alien race shall rule over them. According to Zou, the Han Chinese, as the descendants of the Yellow Emperor, must overthrow the Manchu rule to restore their legitimacy and rights. Wang Jingwei, a Chinese revolutionary who later became an important figure in the Kuomintang, also believed that the Manchus were an inferior race. Wang contended that a state consisting of a single race would be superior to those multiracial ones. Most of the Republican revolutionaries agreed that preserving the race was vital to the survival of the nation. Since the Han had asserted its dominant role in Chinese nationalism, the Manchus had to be either absorbed or eradicated. Historian Prasenjit Duara summarized this by stating that the Republican revolutionaries primarily drew on the international discourse of "racist evolutionism" to envision a "racially purified China."

After the 1911 Revolution, Sun Yat-sen established the Republic of China, the national flag of which contained five colors with each symbolizing a major racial ethnicity of China. This marked a shift from the earlier discourse of radical racism and assimilation of the non-Han groups to the political autonomy of the five races. The rhetorical move, as China historian Joseph Esherick points out, was based on the practical concerns of both imperial threats from the international environment and conflicts on the Chinese frontiers. While both Japan and Russia were encroaching China, the newly born republic also faced ethnic movements in Mongolia and Tibet which claimed themselves to be part of the Qing Empire rather than the Republic of China. Pressured by both domestic and international problems, the fragile Republican regime decided to maintain the borders of the Qing Empire to keep its territories intact. With the increasing threat from the imperialist powers in the 1910s, anti-imperialist sentiments started to grow and spread in China. An ideal of "a morally just universe," anti-imperialism made racism appear shameful and thus took over its dominant role in the conceptualization of Chinese nationalism. Yet racism never perished. Instead, it was embedded by other social realms, including the discourse of eugenics and racial hygiene.

The Blue Shirts Society, a fascist paramilitary organization within the Kuomintang that modelled itself after Mussolini's blackshirts of the National Fascist Party, was anti-foreign and anti-communist, and it stated that its agenda was to expel foreign (Japanese and Western) imperialists from China, crush Communism, and eliminate feudalism. In addition to being anticommunist, some KMT members, like Chiang Kai-shek's right-hand man Dai Li were anti-American, and wanted to expel American influence. In addition, the close Sino-German relations at the time promoted close ties between the Nationalist Government and Nazi Germany.
The New Life Movement was a government-led civic movement in 1930s China initiated by Chiang Kai-shek to promote cultural reform and Neo-Confucian social morality and to ultimately unite China under a centralised ideology following the emergence of ideological challenges to the status quo. The Movement attempted to counter threats of Western and Japanese imperialism through a resurrection of traditional Chinese morality, which it held to be superior to modern Western values. As such the Movement was based upon Confucianism, mixed with Christianity, nationalism and authoritarianism that have some similarities to fascism. It rejected individualism and liberalism, while also opposing socialism and communism. Some historians regard this movement as imitating Nazism and being a neo-nationalistic movement used to elevate Chiang's control of everyday lives. Frederic Wakeman suggested that the New Life Movement was "Confucian fascism".

In response to the Cultural Revolution, Chiang Kai-shek promoted a Chinese Cultural Renaissance movement which followed in the steps of the New Life Movement, promoting Confucian values.

In addition to anti-Manchurism and anti-imperialism, political scientist Chalmers Johnson has argued that the rise of power of the CCP through its alliance with the peasantry should also be understood as "a species of nationalism." Johnson observes that social mobilization, a force that unites people to form a political community together, is the "primary tool" for conceptualizing nationalism. In the context of social mobilization, Chinese nationalism only fully emerged during the Second Sino-Japanese War (1937-1945), when the CCP mobilized the peasantry to fight against the Japanese invaders. Johnson contends that early nationalism of the Kuomintang was quite similar to the late nineteenth-century nationalism in Europe, as both referred to the search for their national identities and positions in the modern world by the intelligentsia. He argues that nationalism constructed by the intellectuals is not identical to nationalism based on mass mobilization, as the nationalist movements led by the Kuomintang, as well as the May Fourth Movement in 1919, were not mass movements because their participants were only a small proportion of the society where the peasants were simply absent. When the Second Sino-Japanese War broke out in 1937, the CCP began to mobilize the Chinese peasantry through mass propaganda of national salvation Johnson observed that the primary shift of the CCP's post-1937 propaganda was its focus on the discourse of national salvation and the temporary retreat of its Communist agenda on class struggle and land redistribution. The wartime alliance of the Chinese peasantry and the CCP manifests how the nationalist ideology of the CCP, or the peasant nationalism, reinforced the desire of the Chinese to save and build a strong nation.

Irredentism and expansionism have also played a role in Chinese nationalism, declaring that China should regain its “lost territories” and form a Greater China. To this day, the Republic of China maintains its territorial claims since its inception in 1912. Its territorial claims were inherited from the Great Qing government as part of the Imperial Edict of the Abdication of the Qing Emperor.

Ethnicity

Defining the relationship between ethnicity and the Chinese identity has been a very complex issue throughout Chinese history. In the 17th century, with the help of Ming Chinese rebels, the Manchus conquered China proper and set up the Qing dynasty. Over the next centuries, they would incorporate groups such as the Tibetans, the Mongols, and the Uyghurs into territories which they controlled. The Manchus were faced with the issue of maintaining loyalty among the people they ruled while at the same time maintaining a distinctive identity. The main method by which they accomplished control of the Chinese heartland was by portraying themselves as enlightened Confucian sages part of whose goal was to preserve and advance Chinese civilization. Over the course of centuries the Manchus were gradually assimilated into the Chinese culture and eventually many Manchus identified themselves as a people of China.

The Chinese nation has also been referred to as descendants of Yandi and Huangdi, who were legendary historical ancestors of the Huaxia people, who were ancestral to the Han Chinese.

The complexity of the relationship between ethnicity and the Chinese identity is best exemplified during the Taiping Rebellion in which the rebels fought fiercely against the Manchus on the ground that they were barbarian foreigners while at the same time others fought just as fiercely on behalf of the Manchus on the grounds that they were the preservers of traditional Chinese values.

The Yihetuan, also known as the Boxers, were a Chinese nationalist and pro-Qing monarchist secret society who initiated the Boxer Rebellion from 1899 to 1901. Their motivations were Anti-Christianism and resistance to Westernisation. The Boxers at their peak were supported by some elements of the Imperial Army. Their slogan was "Support the Qing, destroy foreigners!".

In 1909, the Law of Nationality of Great Qing was published by the Manchu government, which defined Chinese with the following rules: 1) born in China while his/her father is a Chinese; 2) born after his/her father's death while his/her father is a Chinese at his death; 3) his/her mother is a Chinese while his/her father's nationality is unclear or stateless.

In 1919, the May Fourth Movement grew out of student protests to the Treaty of Versailles, especially its terms allowing Japan to keep territories surrendered by Germany after the Siege of Tsingtao, and spurned upsurges of Chinese nationalism amongst the protests.

The official Chinese nationalistic view in the 1920s and 1930s was heavily influenced by modernism and social Darwinism, and included advocacy of the cultural assimilation of ethnic groups in the western and central provinces into the "culturally advanced" Han state, to become in name as well as in fact members of the Chinese nation. Furthermore, it was also influenced by the fate of multi-ethnic states such as Austria-Hungary and the Ottoman Empire. It also became a very powerful force during the Japanese occupation of Coastal China during the 1930s and 1940s and the atrocities committed then.

With the fall of Manchu Qing dynasty and the appear of modern nationalist theogries, "Zhonghua minzu" in the early Republic of China, referred to the Five Races Under One Union concept, which declared that the five major ethnicities in China, the Han Chinese, Manchus, Mongols, Hui, and Tibetans, all belonged to a single Chinese identity, so the government promoted Chinese nationalism for these five ethnic groups but with the Han Chinese are main ethnic group of "Zhonghua minzu" or China, this continued by Nationalist rule under Chiang Kai-shek and his Kuomintang in all China until the proclamation of the People's Republic of China in Chinese Mainland and the Republic of China retreated to Taiwan. While initially rejected by Mao Zedong and his Chinese Communist Party, it later became accepted, the concept of "Chinese" created in Mao's period was "huge Chinese family" or a political union including the Han Chinese and 55 other ethnic groups, similar to the concept of the Soviet people, German Volk, and Yugoslavs, therefore, before Xi Jinping took power, Chinese nationalism of the Chinese Communist Party-led People's Republic of China was influenced strongly by the Soviet Korenizatsiya policy and the Chinese Communist Party also criticized that the Kuomintang-led Republic of China supported Han chauvinism, and the official ideology of the People's Republic of China asserts that China is a multi-ethnic state, and Han Chinese, despite being the overwhelming majority (over 95% in the mainland), they are only one of many ethnic groups of China, each of whose culture and language should be respected (akin to Soviet patriotism), the government also instituted policies of affirmative action, in general, the ethnic policy of the People's Republic of China at the time was strongly influenced by the nature of its Marxist-Leninist state although Chinese nationalism was also promoted by the government, however, many critics argue that despite this official view, assimilationist attitudes remain deeply entrenched, and popular views and actual power relationships create a situation in which Chinese nationalism has in practice meant Han dominance of minority areas and peoples and assimilation of those groups. Since Xi Jinping took power, assimilation has been overt and intensified while preferential policies for ethnic minorities have shrunk.

During the 1960s and 1970s, Chinese nationalism within mainland China became mixed with the rhetoric of Marxism, and nationalistic rhetoric become in large part subsumed into internationalist rhetoric. On the other hand, Chinese nationalism in Taiwan was primarily about preserving the ideals and lineage of Sun Yat-sen, the party he founded, the Kuomintang (KMT), and anti-Communism. While the definition of Chinese nationalism differed in the Republic of China (ROC) and PRC, both were adamant in claiming Chinese territories such as Senkaku (Diaoyutai) Islands.

In the 1990s, the dissolution of the Soviet Union, rising economic standards and the lack of any other legitimizing ideology, has led to what most observers see as a resurgence of nationalism within Mainland China.

Ethnic minorities

Chinese Muslims and Uyghurs

Chinese Muslims have played an important role in Chinese nationalism. Chinese Muslims, known as Hui people, are a mixture of the descendants of foreign Muslims like Arabs and Persians, mixed with Han Chinese who converted to Islam. Chinese Muslims are sinophones, speaking Chinese and practicing Confucianism.

Hu Songshan, a Muslim Imam from Ningxia, was a Chinese nationalist and preached Chinese nationalism and unity of all Chinese people, and also against foreign imperialism and other threats to China's sovereignty. He even ordered the Chinese Flag to be saluted during prayer, and that all Imams in Ningxia preach Chinese nationalism. Hu Songshan led the Ikhwan, the Chinese Muslim Brotherhood, which became a Chinese nationalist, patriotic organization, stressing education and independence of the individual. Hu Songhan also wrote a prayer in Arabic and Chinese, praying for Allah to support the Chinese Kuomintang government and defeat Japan. Hu Songshan also cited a Hadith, a saying of the prophet Muhammad, which says "Loving the Motherland is equivalent to loving the Faith". Hu Songshan harshly criticized those who were non-patriotic and those who taught anti-nationalist thinking, saying that they were fake Muslims.

Ma Qixi was a Muslim reformer, leader of the Xidaotang, and he taught that Islam could only be understood by using Chinese culture such as Confucianism. He read classic Chinese texts and even took his cue from Laozi when he decided to go on Hajj to Mecca.

Ma Fuxiang, a Chinese Muslim general and Kuomintang member, was another Chinese nationalist. Ma Fuxiang preached unity of all Chinese people, and even non-Han Chinese people such as Tibetans and Mongols to stay in China. He proclaimed that Mongolia and Tibet were part of the Republic of China, and not independent countries. Ma Fuxiang was loyal to the Chinese government, and crushed Muslim rebels when ordered to. Ma Fuxiang believed that modern education would help Hui Chinese build a better society and help China resist foreign imperialism and help build the nation. He was praised for his "guojia yizhi"(national consciousness) by non-Muslims. Ma Fuxiang also published many books, and wrote on Confucianism and Islam, having studied both the Quran and the Spring and Autumn Annals.

Ma Fuxiang had served under the Chinese Muslim general Dong Fuxiang, and fought against the foreigners during the Boxer Rebellion. The Muslim unit he served in was noted for being anti-foreign, being involved in shooting a Westerner and a Japanese to death before the Boxer Rebellion broke out. It was reported that the Muslim troops were going to wipe out the foreigners to return a golden age for China, and the Muslims repeatedly attacked foreign churches, railways, and legations, before hostilities even started. The Muslim troops were armed with modern repeater rifles and artillery, and reportedly enthusiastic about going on the offensive and killing foreigners. Ma Fuxiang led an ambush against the foreigners at Langfang and inflicted many casualties, using a train to escape. Dong Fuxiang was a xenophobe and hated foreigners, wanting to drive them out of China.

Various Muslim organizations in China like the Islamic Association of China and the Chinese Muslim Association were sponsored by the Kuomintang and the Chinese Communist Party.

Chinese Muslim imams had synthesized Islam and Confucianism in the Han Kitab. They asserted that there was no contradiction between Confucianism and Islam, and no contradiction between being a Chinese national and a Muslim. Chinese Muslim students returning from study abroad, from places such as Al-Azhar University in Egypt, learned about nationalism and advocated Chinese nationalism at home. One Imam, Wang Jingzhai, who studied at Mecca, translated a Hadith, or saying of Muhammad, "Aiguo Aijiao"- loving the country is equivalent to loving the faith. Chinese Muslims believed that their "Watan"  was the whole of the Republic of China, non-Muslims included.

General Bai Chongxi, the warlord of Guangxi, and a member of the Kuomintang, presented himself as the protector of Islam in China and harbored Muslim intellectuals fleeing from the Japanese invasion in Guangxi. General Bai preached Chinese nationalism and anti-imperialism. Chinese Muslims were sent to Saudi Arabia and Egypt to denounce the Japanese. Translations from Egyptian writings and the Quran were used to support propaganda in favour of a Jihad against Japan.

Ma Bufang, a Chinese Muslim general who was part of the Kuomintang, supported Chinese nationalism and tolerance between the different Chinese ethnic groups. The Japanese attempted to approach him however their attempts at gaining his support were unsuccessful. Ma Bufang presented himself as a Chinese nationalist who fought against Western imperialism to the people of China in order to deflect criticism by opponents that his government was feudal and oppressed minorities like Tibetans and Buddhist Mongols. He presented himself as a Chinese nationalist to his advantage to keep himself in power as noted by the author Erden.

In Xinjiang, the Chinese Muslim general Ma Hushan supported Chinese nationalism. He was chief of the 36th Division of the National Revolutionary Army. He spread anti-Soviet, and anti-Japanese propaganda, and instituted a colonial regime over the Uyghurs. Uyghur street names and signs were changed to Chinese, and the Chinese Muslim troops imported Chinese cooks and baths, rather than using Uyghur ones. The Chinese Muslims even forced the Uyghur carpet industry at Khotan to change its design to Chinese versions. Ma Hushan proclaimed his loyalty to Nanjing, denounced Sheng Shicai as a Soviet puppet, and fought against him in 1937.

The Tungans (Chinese Muslims, Hui people) had anti-Japanese sentiment.

General Ma Hushan's brother Ma Zhongying denounced separatism in a speech at Id Kah Mosque and told the Uyghurs to be loyal to the Chinese government at Nanjing. The 36th division had crushed the Turkish Islamic Republic of East Turkestan, and the Chinese Muslim general Ma Zhancang beheaded the Uyghur emirs Abdullah Bughra and Nur Ahmad Jan Bughra. Ma Zhancang abolished the Islamic Sharia law which was set up by the Uyghurs, and set up military rule instead, retaining the former Chinese officials and keeping them in power. The Uyghurs had been promoting Islamism in their separatist government, but Ma Hushan eliminated religion from politics. Islam was barely mentioned or used in politics or life except as a vague spiritual focus for unified opposition against the Soviet Union.

The Uyghur warlord Yulbars Khan was pro-China and supported the Republic of China. The Uyghur politician Masud Sabri served as the Governor of Xinjiang Province from 1947 to 1949.

Tibetans

Pandatsang Rapga, a Tibetan politician, founded the Tibet Improvement Party with the goal of modernisation and integration of Tibet into the Republic of China.

The 9th Panchen Lama, Thubten Choekyi Nyima, was considered extremely "pro-Chinese", according to official Chinese sources.

Mongols
Many of the Chinese troops used to occupy Mongolia in 1919 were Chahar Mongols, which has been a major cause for animosity between Khalkhas and Inner Mongols.

Manchus
In the late Qing Dynasty, revolutionaries incited anti-Manchuism to overthrow the Qing dynasty, especially Zou Rong.

In Taiwan

One common goal of current Chinese nationalists is the unification of mainland China and Taiwan. While this was the commonly stated goal of both the People's Republic of China and the Republic of China (Taiwan) before 1992, both sides differed sharply in the form of unification due to obvious and salient differences in political ideology.

In Taiwan, there is a general consensus to support the status quo of Taiwan's de facto independence as a separate nation. Despite this, the relationship between Chinese nationalism and Taiwan remains controversial, involving symbolic issues such as the use of "The Republic of China" as the official name of the government on Taiwan and the use of the word "China" in the name of Government-owned corporations. Broadly speaking, there is little support in Taiwan for immediate unification. Overt support for formal independence is also muted due to the PRC's insistence on military action should Taiwan make such a formal declaration. The argument against unification is partly over culture and whether democratic Taiwanese should see themselves as Chinese or Taiwanese; and partly over mistrust of the authoritarian Chinese Communist Party (CCP), its human rights record, and its de-democratizing actions in Hong Kong (e.g. 2014–15 Hong Kong electoral reform, which sparked the Umbrella Movement). These misgivings are particularly prevalent amongst younger generations of Taiwanese, who generally view both the CCP and the KMT as obsolete and consider themselves to have little or no connection to China, whose government they perceive as a foreign aggressor.

In response to the Taiwan independence movement, there have been radical Chinese nationalist groups founded in Taiwan, such as the Patriot Alliance Association founded in 1993. Another political party is the Chinese Unification Promotion Party, founded by the Taiwanese mafia leader Chang An-lo, a radical Chinese ultranationalist. This political party has been accused of violence against Hong Kong opposition figures, such as Denise Ho and Lam Wing-kee.

Nationalist symbology
 In addition to the national symbols of China, the national symbols of the Republic of China, and the flags of China, there are many symbols opted for use by Chinese nationalists. Some of these include Chinese legendary or ancient figures such as the Yellow Emperor and the Fire Emperor, Yu the Great, Qin Shi Huang, or more modern figures such as Sun Yat-sen, Chiang Kai-shek, or Mao Zedong. Another symbol often used is the Chinese dragon as a personification for the Chinese nation.

Similar to the use of the chrysanthemum (which also has cultural significance in China) in Japan as the Imperial Seal of Japan, the plum blossom is also a national symbol of China, designated by the Legislative Yuan in the Republic of China on 21 July 1964. It was also proposed to be the national flower of the People's Republic of China. The Republic of China patriotic song The Plum Blossom revolves around its symbolism for China.

In the Republic of China, as the National Flower, the plum blossom symbolises:
 Three buds and five petals - symbolises Three Principles of the People and the five branches of the Government in accordance with the Constitution
 The plum blossom withstands the cold winter (it blossoms more in colder temperatures) - it symbolises the faithful, the resolute and the holy; it represents the national spirit of Republic of China nationals.
 The five petals of the flower - symbolises Five Races Under One Union; it also symbolises Five Cardinal Relationships (Wǔlún), Five Constants (Wǔcháng) and Five Ethics (Wǔjiào) according to Confucian philosophy (national philosophy of imperial China for two millennia until 1912, when the Qing Dynasty was overthrown and the Republic of China was established)
The branches (枝橫), shadow (影斜), flexibility (曳疏), and cold resistance (傲霜) of the plum blossom also represent the four kinds of noble virtues, "originating and penetrating, advantageous and firm" mentioned in the I Ching (Book of Changes).

Opposition

In addition to the Taiwan independence movement and Hong Kong independence movement, there are a number of ideologies which exist in opposition to Chinese nationalism.

Some opponents have asserted that Chinese nationalism is inherently backward and is therefore incompatible with a modern state. Some claim that Chinese nationalism is actually a manifestation of beliefs in Han Chinese ethnic superiority (also known as Sinocentrism), though this is hotly debated.

The so-called Milk Tea Alliance movement which exists in Hong Kong, Taiwan, and Thailand is also in opposition to Chinese nationalism.

Elements of Japanese nationalism are hostile to China. In World War II, the Empire of Japan conquered large swathes of Chinese territory, and many contemporary nationalists in Japan deny the events of the Nanking Massacre.

Northern and Southern

American scholar Edward Friedman has argued that there is a northern governmental, political, bureaucratic Chinese nationalism that is at odds with a southern, commercial Chinese nationalism.

Populism
Populist nationalism is a comparatively late development in Chinese nationalism of the 1990s. It began to take recognizable shape after 1996, as a joint result of the evolving nationalist thinking of the early 1990s and the ongoing debates on modernity, postmodernism, postcolonialism, and their political implications-debates that have engaged many Chinese intellectuals since early 1995.

Modern times

During the Cold War era, American strategies to contain the spread of communism fueled nationalist sentiment in China, including as a result of the Korean War, the Taiwan Strait Crisis, the PRC's exclusion from the United Nations, and the U.S. embargo of China.

The end of the Cold War has seen the revival throughout the world of nationalist sentiments and aspirations, nationalism is seen as increasing the legitimacy of Chinese Communist Party rule. One remarkable phenomenon in the post-Cold War upsurge of Chinese nationalism is that Chinese intellectuals became one of the driving forces. Many well-educated people-social scientists, humanities scholars, writers, and other professionals have given voice to and even become articulators for rising nationalistic discourse in the 1990s. Some commentators have proposed that "positive nationalism" could be an important unifying factor for the country as it has been for other countries. China has also pursued ethno-nationalist policies aimed at appealing to its diaspora abroad.

On 7 May 1999, during Operation Allied Force (NATO bombing of Yugoslavia), NATO aircraft bombed the Chinese embassy in Belgrade, Yugoslavia, killing three Chinese citizens. The US claimed that the bombing was an accident caused by the use of outdated maps but few Chinese accepted this explanation. The incident caused widespread anger and following the attack Chinese officials described the bombing as a "barbarian act" and a "war crime" while Chinese students in Europe and America demonstrated against 'NATO fascism'. In China thousands were involved in protest marches in Beijing and other provincial capitals, some protesters threw gas bombs and rocks at the diplomatic missions of the United States and other NATO countries while in Chengdu the American Consul's residence was firebombed, deepening anti-Western and anti-American sentiment in China. China, along with Russia, had already supported Slobodan Milošević and the Federal Republic of Yugoslavia during the Kosovo War, and opposed NATO bombardment of Yugoslavia.

In the 21st century, notable spurs of grassroots Chinese nationalism grew from what the Chinese public saw as the marginalization of their country from Japan and the Western world. One such event occurred in the Hainan Island incident of April 1, 2001, in which a United States US EP-3 surveillance aircraft collided mid-air with a Chinese Shenyang J-8 jet fighter over the South China Sea. China sought a formal apology, and President Jiang Zemin accepted United States Secretary of State Colin Powell's expression of "very sorry" as sufficient. The incident nonetheless created negative feelings towards the United States by the Chinese public and increased public feelings of Chinese nationalism.

The Japanese history textbook controversies, as well as Prime Minister Junichiro Koizumi's visits to the Yasukuni Shrine was the source of considerable anger on Chinese blogs. In addition, the protests following the 2008 Tibetan unrest of the Olympic torch has gathered strong opposition within the Chinese community inside China and abroad. Almost every Tibetan protest on the Olympic torch route was met with a considerable pro-China protest. Because the 2008 Summer Olympics were a major source of national pride, anti-Olympics sentiments are often seen as anti-Chinese sentiments inside China. Moreover, the Sichuan earthquake in 2008 sparked a high sense of nationalism from the Chinese at home and abroad. The central government's quick response to the disaster was instrumental in galvanizing general support from the population amidst harsh criticism directed towards China's handling of the Lhasa riots only two months previously. In 2005, anti-Japanese demonstrations were held throughout Asia as a result of events such as the Japanese history textbook controversies. In 2012, Chinese people in mainland China, Hong Kong, and Taiwan held anti-Japanese protests due to the escalating Senkaku Islands dispute.

Nationalism was witnessed at the 2008 Olympic torch relay where pro-Olympic protests were held by overseas Chinese in response to disruptions by anti-China activists in Paris and London. At least 5,000 Chinese Americans including immigrants from mainland China, Hong Kong, Taiwan and Southeast Asia also protested outside CNN's Hollywood offices after CNN commentator Jack Cafferty described Chinese products as "junk" and the Chinese as “goons” and “thugs” during a segment about China's relationship with America. When the Olympic torch passed through Paris, a pro-Tibetan independence protestor attempted to snatch it from a young handicapped Chinese athlete who clung to it. The images were widely televised and led to an internet rumor that accused French supermarket company Carrefour of funding Tibetan independence groups. Protests and calls for boycott resulted and ultimately subsided, in part because of efforts by French officials to apologize for the Paris torch attack.

Another example of modern nationalism in China is the Hanfu movement, which is a Chinese movement in the early 21st century that seeks the revival of Chinese traditional clothing.

The China–United States trade war also fueled nationalist sentiment among both CCP leadership and the general public. The external pressure of the trade war allowed Xi Jinping to point to the United States' actions as a reason for China's economic slowdown. The Chinese public responded. Academic Suisheng Zhao summarizes, "Proud of their accomplishments through hard work, tremendous sacrifices, dogged determination, and well-crafted policies, many Chinese are fed up with US criticisms that China's rise is because it did not play by rules, violated international commitments, and tilted the playing field to advantage Chinese firms."

Credit Suisse has determined through a 2018 survey that young Chinese consumers are turning to local brands as a result of growing nationalism. Local brands like Lenovo have also received backlash from some online Chinese for being unpatriotic.

In 2021 Hannah Bailey, a researcher of Chinese internet censorship at the University of Oxford's Internet Institute, noted a shift in China's approach toward deriving legitimacy from nationalism, compared to the earlier approach based on its economic performance.

Internet activism

In the 1990s, nationalists among the Chinese public were primarily connected through the internet.

In 2005, twenty-two million Chinese netizens signed an internet petition in opposition to Japan's efforts to join the United Nations Security Council.

In response to protests during the 2008 Olympic Torch Relay, the Chinese blogosphere became filled with nationalistic material, many of which highlighted perceived biases and inaccuracies in Western media such as photos of clashes between police and Tibetan independence protestors that took place in Nepal and India but captioned to seem as if the events happened in China. One such site, Anti-CNN, claimed that news channels such as CNN and BBC pushed false narratives and only reported selectively in the 2008 Tibetan unrest.

Chinese hackers have claimed to have attacked the CNN website numerous times, through the use of DDoS attacks. Similarly, the Yasukuni Shrine website was hacked by Chinese hackers during late 2004, and another time on 24 December 2008.

During the 2019–2020 Hong Kong protests, in response to protestors doxing police officers and people unsupportive of the protests, some Chinese nationalists in Hong Kong responded by doxing protestors.

During the Russo-Ukrainian War (in particular the 2022 Russian invasion of Ukraine), nationalistic netizens disseminated pro-Russian sentiments and posted pro-Russian posts across the Chinese internet.

Xi Jinping and the "Chinese Dream"

As Xi Jinping solidified his control after 2012, became the General Secretary of the Chinese Communist Party, the CCP has used the phrase "Chinese Dream", to describe his overarching plans for China. Xi first used the phrase during a high-profile visit to the National Museum of China on 29 November 2012, where he and his Standing Committee colleagues were attending a "national revival" (民族复兴; more commonly translated "national rejuvenation" to differentiate from national awakening) exhibition. Since then, the phrase has become the signature political slogan of the Xi era. In the public media, the Chinese Dream and nationalism are interwoven. In diplomacy, the Chinese dream and nationalism have been closely linked to the Belt and Road Initiative. Peter Ferdinand argues that it thus becomes a dream about a future in which China "will have recovered its rightful place."

References

Further reading

 Befu, Harumi. Cultural Nationalism in East Asia: Representation and Identity (1993). Berkeley, Calif.: Institute of East Asian Studies, University of California.
 Cabestan, Jean-Pierre. "The many facets of Chinese nationalism." China perspectives  (2005) 2005.59 online.
 Chang, Maria Hsia. Return of the Dragon: China's Wounded Nationalism, (Westview Press, 2001), 256 pp, 
 Chow, Kai-Wing. "Narrating Nation, Race and National Culture: Imagining the Hanzu Identity in Modern China," in Chow Kai-Wing, Kevin M. Doak, and Poshek Fu, eds., Constructing nationhood in modern East Asia (2001). Ann Arbor: University of Michigan Press, pp. 47–84.
 Gries, Peter Hays. China's New Nationalism: Pride, Politics, and Diplomacy, University of California Press (January 2004), hardcover, 224 pages, 
 Duara, Prasenjit, "De-constructing the Chinese Nation," in Australian Journal of Chinese Affairs (July 1993, No. 30, pp. 1–26).
 Duara, Prasenjit. Rescuing History from the Nation Chicago and London: University of Chicago Press, 1995.
 Fitzgerald, John.  Awakening China – Politics, Culture and Class in the Nationalist Revolution (1996). Stanford University Press.
 He, Baogang. Nationalism, national identity and democratization in China (Routledge, 2018).
 Hoston, Germaine A. The State, Identity, and the National Question in China and Japan (1994). Princeton UP.
 Huang, Grace C. Chiang Kai-shek's Politics of Shame: Leadership, Legacy, and National Identity in China. Cambridge: Harvard University Asia Center, 2021.
 Hughes, Christopher. Chinese Nationalism in the Global Era (2006).
 Judge, Joan. "Talent, Virtue and Nation: Chinese Nationalism and Female Subjectivities in the Early Twentieth Century," American Historical Review 106#3 (2001) pp. 765–803. online
 Karl, Rebecca E. Staging the World - Chinese Nationalism at the Turn of the Twentieth Century (Duke UP, 2002) excerpt
 Leibold, James. Reconfiguring Chinese nationalism: How the Qing frontier and its indigenes became Chinese (Palgrave MacMillan, 2007). 
 Lust, John. "The Su-pao Case: An Episode in the Early Chinese Nationalist Movement," Bulletin of the School of Oriental and African Studies 27#2 (1964) pp. 408–429. online
 
 Nyíri, Pál, and Joana Breidenbach, eds. China Inside Out: Contemporary Chinese Nationalism and Transnationalism (2005) online
 Pye, Lucian W. "How China's nationalism was Shanghaied." Australian Journal of Chinese Affairs 29 (1993): 107–133.
 Tan, Alexander C. and Boyu Chen."China's Competing and Co-opting Nationalisms: Implications to Sino-Japanese Relations." Pacific Focus (2013) 28#3 pp. 365–383). abstract
 Tønnesson, Stein. "Will nationalism drive conflict in Asia?." Nations and Nationalism 22#2 (2016) online.
 Unger, Jonathan, ed. Chinese nationalism (M, E. Sharpe, 1996). 
 Wang, Gungwu. The revival of Chinese nationalism (IIAS, International Institute for Asian Studies, 1996).
 Wei, C.X. George and Xiaoyuan Liu, eds. Chinese Nationalism in Perspective: Historical and Recent Cases (2001) online
 Zhang, Huijie, Fan Hong, and Fuhua Huang. "Cultural Imperialism, Nationalism, and the Modernization of Physical Education and Sport in China, 1840–1949." International Journal of the History of Sport 35.1 (2018): 43–60.
 Zhao Suisheng. A Nation-State by Construction. Dynamics of Modern Chinese Nationalism (Stanford UP, 2004) 
 Harvard Asia Pacific Review, 2010. "Nations and Nationalism." Available at Issuu Harvard Asia Pacific Review 11.1 
 Chinese Nationalism and Its Future Prospects, Interview with Yingjie Guo (27 June 2012)

 
Nationalism in China
Anti-American sentiment in China
Anti-Japanese sentiment in China
Anti-South Korean sentiment in China
Racism in China